James Bloodworth may refer to:

 James Bloodworth (journalist), English journalist
 James Bloodworth Jr. (1925–2006), American physician, pathologist, and researcher
 James N. Bloodworth (1921–1980), Justice of the Supreme Court of Alabama

See also
 James Bloodsworth (1759–1804), convict sentenced for the theft of one game cock and two hens